My Disillusionment in Russia is a book by Emma Goldman, published in 1923 by Doubleday, Page & Co. The book was based on a much longer manuscript entitled "My Two Years in Russia" which was an eyewitness account of events in Russia from 1920 to 1921 that ensued in the wake of the Russian Revolution of 1917 and which culminated in the Kronstadt rebellion. Long-concerned about developments with the Bolsheviks, Goldman described the rebellion as the "final wrench. I saw before me the Bolshevik State, formidable, crushing every constructive revolutionary effort, suppressing, debasing, and disintegrating everything".

Much to Goldman's dismay, only upon receiving the first printed copies of the book did she become aware that (1) the publisher had changed the title; and (2) the last twelve chapters were entirely missing, including an Afterword which Goldman felt was "the most vital part" of the book.  Sympathetic to the initial Russian Revolution, the complete book is an impassioned left critique of the Bolshevik Revolution as well as Vladimir Lenin's New Economic Policy—an "all-powerful, centralized Government with State Capitalism as its economic expression". The complete book is also critical of Marxian theory, which Goldman describes as "a cold, mechanistic, enslaving formula".

After much back and forth with the publishers, the missing portions of Goldman's original manuscript were published in a second (American) volume My Further Disillusionment in Russia (also titled by the publisher) in 1924. In the preface to the second "volume" of the American edition, Goldman wryly observes that only two of the reviewers sensed the incompleteness of the original American version, one of whom was not a regular critic, but a librarian. A complete version of the  complete manuscript was published in England with an introduction by Rebecca West, also with the title My Disillusionment in Russia (London: C. W. Daniel Company, 1925).

References

External links 
 
  
 My Disillusionment in Russia - RevoltLib Source

1923 non-fiction books
Anarchism in Russia
Anarchism in the Soviet Union
Memoirs about Soviet repression
Books by Emma Goldman